Pembine is an unincorporated census-designated place in Marinette County, Wisconsin (USA), in the town of Pembine. It is located on U.S. Route 141 and U.S. Route 8. It uses the Postal ZIP code 54156. As of the 2010 census, its population is 193.

Images

References

Census-designated places in Marinette County, Wisconsin
Census-designated places in Wisconsin